Daphne Oseña-Paez (born March 15, 1970) is a Filipino television host, news reporter, author, blogger and entrepreneur.

Education 
Oseña-Paez obtained her Bachelor of Arts with a Specialist in Art History and Major in Urban Studies from the University of Toronto.

Career 

Osena-Paez initially started as a news reporter of ABS-CBN and Studio 23 and was the weather presenter of the late night English newscast The World Tonight from 1996 to 1999.

From 1999 to 2006, she hosted the lifestyle show F! with Angel Aquino and Cher Calvin—with model Amanda Griffin later taking over Calvin in 2003. In 2000, she also started hosting Bayan Productions's A Guide to Urban Living. When F! ended; she hosted Urban Zone, where she was also creator, producer and writer, the show ran from 2006 to 2012. She also hosted Proudly Filipina from 2006 to 2008.

Osena-Paez appeared in the film You Changed My Life and launched her own line of linens in partnership with Linens Direct in 2009. In 2010, she launched Daphne, originally a furniture line and eventually would include home scents and jewelry. She hosted the lifestyle show Cocktales with Vic Agustin and Cita Revilla in 2013 and started her blog daphne.ph in 2014.

In 2016, her book Chic: Tips on Life, Style, and Work was released. She started appearing in AirAsia's travel web series Red Talks in 2018.

In 2021, Oseña-Paez started hosting Recreate, a lifestyle show presenting local artists and creativity on Cignal TV.

In December 2022, she was appointed as Malacañang Palace press briefer.

Personal life 
Oseña-Paez is married to journalist Patrick Paez. Together they have three daughters Sophia, Stella and Lily.

She was appointed UNICEF goodwill ambassador in 2019.

Awards and nominations

References

External links

Filipino women journalists
Filipino women in business
Living people
1970 births